Sias or SIAS may refer to:
 Sias, West Virginia, unincorporated community in Lincoln County, West Virginia, United States
 Sias International University, a private college affiliated with Zhengzhou University in Henan Province, People's Republic of China
 Some Institutes for Advanced Study

People with the surname
 David Sias (born 1987), American soccer player
 Don E. Sias (died 1934), American politician

SIAS
 Social Interaction Anxiety Scale, a self-report scale that measures distress when meeting and talking with others
 Spina iliaca anterior superior, medical Latin term for the Anterior superior iliac spine
 Student Investment Advisory Service, student managed investments fund and part of Simon Fraser University
 Serviciul pentru Intervenții și Acțiuni Speciale, a task force of the Romanian Police